The Madonna with the Long Neck, also known as Madonna and Long Child with Angels and St. Jerome, is an Italian Mannerist oil painting by  Parmigianino, dating from c. 1535-1540 and depicting Madonna and Child with angels. The painting was begun in 1534 for the funerary chapel of Francesco Tagliaferri in Parma, but remained incomplete on Parmigianino's death in 1540. Ferdinando de' Medici, Grand Prince of Tuscany, purchased it in 1698 and it has been on display at the Uffizi since 1948.

Description 
The painting depicts the Virgin Mary seated on a high pedestal in luxurious robes, holding a large baby Jesus on her lap.  Six angels crowded together on the Madonna's right adore the Christ-child. In the lower right-hand corner of the painting is an enigmatic scene, with a row of marble columns and the emaciated figure of St. Jerome. A depiction of St. Jerome was required by the commissioner because of the saint's connection with the adoration of the Virgin Mary.

The painting is popularly called Madonna of the Long Neck because "the painter, in his eagerness to make the Holy Virgin look graceful and elegant, has given her a neck like that of a swan." On the unusual arrangement of figures, Austrian-British art historian E. H. Gombrich writes:

Parmigianino has distorted nature for his own artistic purposes, creating a typical Mannerist figura serpentinata. Jesus is also extremely large for a baby, and he lies precariously on Mary's lap as if about to fall at any moment. The Madonna herself is of hardly human proportions—she is almost twice the size of the angels to her right. Her right foot rests on cushions that appear to be only a few inches away from the picture plane, but the foot itself seems to project beyond it, and is thus on "our" side of the canvas, breaking the conventions of a framed picture. Her slender hands and long fingers have also led the Italian medical scientist Vito Franco of the University of Palermo to diagnose that Parmigianino's model had the genetic disorder Marfan syndrome affecting her connective tissue.

References 

Long Neck
1530s paintings
Paintings in the collection of the Uffizi
Parmigianino
Mannerist paintings
Angels in art
Unfinished paintings